Haron Keitany (born December 17, 1983) is a runner from Kenya, who specialises in 1500 metres. In 2008, he won 1500 metres races at the African Championships, the IAAF Golden League meeting of Weltklasse Zürich, and World Athletics Final. He missed the Beijing Olympics though, after finishing fourth at the Kenyan trials.

He competed at the 2009 World Championships, but did not start his semifinal.

His personal best over 1500 metres is 3:30.20, set in June 2009.

Keitany is nicknamed “Land Cruiser”. He is the sixth-born in a family of 10. He graduated from Anasens High School in Wareng District in 2003 and took up running two year later. He is trained by Amos Korir at Golazo Athletics Club in Eldoret

Achievements

Personal Bests
Outdoors
1500 Metres - 3:30.20 - Berlin, GER - 14/06/2009
Mile - 3:48.78 - Eugene, OR - 07/06/2009
Indoors
1000 Metres - 2:16.76 - Moskava - 01/02/2009
1500 Metres - 3:33.96 - Gent - 08/02/2009

References

External links

1983 births
Living people
Kenyan male middle-distance runners